The 725th Strategic Missile Squadron is an inactive United States Air Force unit. It was last assigned to the 451st Strategic Missile Wing at Lowry Air Force Base, Colorado, where it was inactivated on 25 June 1965.

The squadron was first activated in May 1943 as the 725th Bombardment Squadron.  After training in the United States, it deployed to the Mediterranean Theater of Operations, where it participated in the strategic bombing campaign against Germany.  The squadron earned three Distinguished Unit Citations for its actions during the war.  Following V-E Day, the 725th returned to the United States and was inactivated.  It was activated again as a missile unit in 1961, when it assumed the assets of another squadron.

History

World War II

Organization and training in the United States
The squadron was first activated in May 1943 as the 725th Bombardment Squadron at Davis-Monthan Field, Arizona.  It was one of the four original squadrons of the 451st Bombardment Group.  Although original plans were for the squadron to be an Operational Training Unit at Davis-Monthan, instead a cadre of the 451st Group moved to Dyersburg Army Air Base, Tennessee, where the 725th and other elements of the group were filled out by personnel drawn from the 346th Bombardment Group.  The squadron commander, Capt John P. Davis, and a model crew joined other members of the group for advanced tactical training with the Army Air Forces School of Applied Tactics at Orlando Army Air Base, Florida.  This cadre joined the remainder of the squadron at Wendover Field, Utah for training with the Consolidated B-24 Liberator.  The squadron continued its training at Fairmont Army Air Field, Nebraska, starting in September. On 18 November, the air echelon of the squadron departed Fairmont for staging at Lincoln Army Air Field, Nebraska to ferry their aircraft via the South Atlantic air ferry route to the Mediterranean Theater of Operations.  The ground echelon left on 26 November for the port of embarkation at Camp Patrick Henry, Virginia for transportation by ship.

Combat operations

The squadron arrived at Gioia del Colle Airfield, Italy at the beginning of January 1944, although the air echelon remained at Telergma Airfield, Algeria until 20 January to conduct additional training.  The squadron functioned primarily as a strategic bombing unit, attacking targets like oil refineries, marshalling yards, aircraft factories and airfields in Italy, Germany, France, Czechoslovakia, Austria, Bulgaria, Hungary, Romania, Greece and Albania.  It earned a Distinguished Unit Citation during Big Week for an attack on a Messerschmitt aircraft factory at Regensburg, Germany on 25 February 1944.  It added oak leaf clusters to this award for an attack on oil refineries and marshalling yards at Ploesti, Romania on 5 April 1944 and on Markersdorf-Haindorf Airfield near Vienna, Austria on 23 August 1944.  On each of these missions the squadron was opposed by large numbers of enemy interceptor aircraft and heavy flak, but fought its way through to inflict serious damage on the targets and destroy many enemy aircraft.

When returning from the Regensburg attack, runway conditions at Gioia del Colle were so poor that the aircraft of the 451st Group were unable to land there.  Instead, the group's squadrons spread out among a number of bases in Italy.  These poor conditions continued and on 8 March the squadron moved to Manduria Airfield, Italy.  The 451st Group's 727th Bombardment Squadron was also relocated there

On 6 April, the 725th moved to Castelluccio Airfield, where it joined the remainder of the group.  From its new base, the squadron also flew air support and interdiction missions.  It helped prepare the way for Operation Dragoon, the invasion of southern France in August 1944.  The following month its bombers transported supplies to forces operating in Italy,  It also supported Operation Grapeshot the final advance of Allied armies in northern Italy.  The squadron's last mission was flown on 26 April 1945 against marshalling yards at Sachsenburg, Austria.

The squadron assembled later in the month at Dow Field, Maine, where it was inactivated on 26 September 1945. Personnel that were not discharged from the service on return to the United States were transferred to Air Transport Command units at Dow.

Strategic Air Command
Strategic Air Command (SAC)'s first HGM-25A Titan I wing, the 703d Strategic Missile Wing was located at Lowry Air Force Base, Colorado.  SAC decided to replace the 703d Wing with the 451st Strategic Missile Wing.  As part of this change, the squadron was redesignated the 725th Strategic Missile Squadron and organized on 1 July 1961 to replace the 849th Strategic Missile Squadron, which was simultaneously inactivated.  The 725th absorbed the 849th's mission, personnel and missiles.

the squadron was deployed in a "3x3" configuration, which meant its nine missiles were divided into three sites. Each had three intercontinental ballistic missiles.  The squadron missile sites were:
 725-A, 14 miles SE of Watkins, Colorado 
 725-B, 4 miles NNE of Deer Trail, Colorado
 725-C, 5 miles SSE of Elisabeth, Colorado  

On 19 November 1964, Defense Secretary Robert McNamara announced the phase-out of the remaining first-generation SM-65 Atlas and Titan I missiles by the end of June 1965. Consequently, the Titan Is of the 725th were removed from alert status and the squadron shipped the Air Force's last strategic Titan I missile out on 15 April. The Air Force subsequently inactivated the squadron on 25 June.

Lineage
 Constituted as the 725th Bombardment Squadron (Heavy) on 6 April 1943
 Activated on 1 May 1943
 Redesignated 725th Bombardment Squadron, Heavy on 10 May 1943
 Inactivated on 26 September 1945
 Redesignated 725th Strategic Missile Squadron (ICBM-Titan) and activated on 26 April 1961 (not organized)
 Organized on 1 July 1961
 Inactivated on 25 June 1965

Assignments
 451st Bombardment Group, 1 May 1943 – 26 September 1945
 Strategic Air Command, 26 April 1961 (not organized)
 451st Strategic Missile Wing, 1 July 1961 – 25 June 1965

Stations

 Davis-Monthan Field, Arizona, 1 May 1943
 Dyersburg Army Air Base, Tennessee, 4 June 1943
 Wendover Field, Utah, c. 19 July 1943
 Fairmont Army Air Field, Nebraska, 8 September–26 November 1943
 Gioia del Colle Airfield, Italy, 2 January 1944

 Maduria Airfield, Italy 8 March 1944
 Castelluccio Airfield, Italy c. 6 April 1944 – c. 4 June 1945
 Dow Field, Maine, 18 June–26 September 1945
 Lowry Air Force Base, Colorado, 26 April 1961 – 25 June 1965

Aircraft and missiles
 Consolidated B-24 Liberator, 1943–1945
 HGM-25A Titan I, 1961–1965

Awards and campaigns

See also

 List of United States Air Force missile squadrons
 B-24 Liberator units of the United States Army Air Forces

References

Notes
 Explanatory notes

 Citations

Bibliography

 
 
 
 
 
 
STRATEGIC MISSILES
 
 

Strategic missile squadrons of the United States Air Force
Military units and formations disestablished in 1965